Tappan Bridge, also known as Kittle Bridge is a wooden covered bridge in the town of Hardenburgh in Ulster County, New York.

External links
 Tappan Bridge, at New York State Covered Bridge Society
 Tappan Bridge, at Covered Bridges of the Northeast USA, a website developed by Hank Brickel

Covered bridges in New York (state)
Bridges in Ulster County, New York
Bridges completed in 1906
Wooden bridges in New York (state)
Road bridges in New York (state)
1906 establishments in New York (state)